Vaires-sur-Marne (literally 'Vaires on Marne') is a commune in the Seine-et-Marne department in the Île-de-France region, north-central France. Vaires-sur-Marne is the Western end of the LGV Est, reaching Vendenheim (near Strasbourg). Vaires–Torcy station has rail connections to Meaux and Paris.

Demographics
Inhabitants of Vaires-sur-Marne are called Vairois.

See also
Communes of the Seine-et-Marne department

References

External links

Official site 

Communes of Seine-et-Marne
Venues of the 2024 Summer Olympics
Olympic rowing venues
Olympic kayaking venues
Seine-et-Marne communes articles needing translation from French Wikipedia